Stahl Peak is a peak 2 nautical miles (3.7 km) east of Saburro Peak in the Ravens Mountains, Britannia Range, Antarctica. It rises to over 1800 meters. Named after CMSgt. Alfred E. Stahl who served with the 109th Airlift Wing as a Flight Engineer Superintendent during the transition of LC-130 operations from the U.S. Navy to the Air National Guard

Mountains of Oates Land